The Institute for Advancements in Mental Health, formerly known as the Schizophrenia Society of Ontario (SSO), is a charitable organization located in Ontario, Canada, that exists to help those affected by mental illnesses.

It was founded in 1979 under the name Ontario Friends of Schizophrenics and adopted its current name in 1995. Its mission is to improve the quality of life for those affected by schizophrenia and psychosis through education, support programs, public policy, and research.

References

External links

Schizophrenia-related organizations
Medical and health organizations based in Ontario
Mental health organizations in Canada